Gua Kanthan bent-toed gecko (Cyrtodactylus guakanthanensis)  is a species of gecko that is endemic to Malaysia.

References 

Cyrtodactylus
Reptiles described in 2014